The 2017 European Rowing Championships were held in Račice, Czech Republic, between 24 and 28 May 2017.

Medal summary

Men

Women

(*) Exhibition races

Medal table

References

European Rowing Championships
2017
International sports competitions hosted by the Czech Republic
European Rowing Championships
Rowing competitions in the Czech Republic